is a passenger railway station in located in the city of Yokkaichi,  Mie Prefecture, Japan, operated by the private railway operator Kintetsu Railway.

Lines
Akuragawa Station is served by the Nagoya Line, and is located 34.6 rail kilometers from the starting point of the line at Kintetsu Nagoya Station.

Station layout
The station consists of two opposed side platforms, connected by an underground passage.

This station had two island platforms serving four lines until March 16, 2018. It was abolished with the change of time of the next day, and the bus number was changed.

Platforms

Adjacent stations

History
Akuragawa Station opened on January 30, 1929, as a station on the Ise Railway. The Ise Railway became the Sangu Express Electric Railway’s Ise Line on September 15, 1936, and was renamed the Nagoya Line on December 7, 1938. After merging with Osaka Electric Kido on March 15, 1941, the line became the Kansai Express Railway's Nagoya Line. This line was merged with the Nankai Electric Railway on June 1, 1944, to form Kintetsu.

Passenger statistics
In fiscal 2019, the station was used by an average of 2464 passengers daily (boarding passengers only).

Surrounding area
Yokkaichi City Hall Kaizo District Citizen Center
Yokkaichi Kaizo Elementary School
Yokkaichi City Yamate Junior High School

See also
List of railway stations in Japan

References

External links

 Kintetsu: Akuragawa Station

Railway stations in Japan opened in 1929
Railway stations in Mie Prefecture
Stations of Kintetsu Railway
Yokkaichi